Fog on the Tyne is a 1971 album by English rock band Lindisfarne. Bob Johnston produced the album, which was recorded at Trident Studios in Soho, London, in the mid-1971 and released in October that year on Charisma Records in the United Kingdom and Elektra Records in the U.S..

It gave the group their breakthrough in the UK, topping the album charts early in 1972 for four weeks and remaining on the chart for 56 weeks in total. "Meet Me on the Corner", one of two songs written by bassist Rod Clements, reached No. 5 as a single.  The title track became the band's signature tune.  Simon Cowe made his debut as a writer, contributing the song "Uncle Sam".

Both tracks on the B-side of "Meet Me on the Corner", "Scotch Mist" (an instrumental), and "No Time To Lose", appeared as bonus tracks when the album was reissued on CD.

A heavily reworked version of the title track with vocals by footballer Paul Gascoigne was released in October 1990 under the title "Fog on the Tyne (Revisited)", credited to Gazza and Lindisfarne. It reached number two in the UK Singles Chart.

Reggae group The Pioneers recorded a version of "Alright on the Night" on their 1972 album I Believe in Love.

Track listing
"Meet Me on the Corner" (Rod Clements) – 2:38 lead vocals: Ray Jackson
"Alright on the Night" (Alan Hull) – 3:32 lead vocals: Alan Hull, Ray Jackson and Simon Cowe
"Uncle Sam" (Simon Cowe) – 2:55 lead vocals: Ray Jackson
"Together Forever" (Rab Noakes) – 2:34 lead vocals: Ray Jackson
"January Song" (Hull) – 4:13 lead vocals: Alan Hull
"Peter Brophy Don't Care" (Hull, Terry Morgan) – 2:47 lead vocals: Alan Hull
"City Song" (Hull) – 3:06 lead vocals: Alan Hull
"Passing Ghosts" (Hull) – 2:28 lead vocals: Alan Hull
"Train in G Major" (Clements) – 3:08 lead vocals: Ray Jackson
"Fog on the Tyne" (Hull) – 3:23 lead vocals: Alan Hull, Ray Jackson and Simon Cowe
Bonus Tracks on CD reissue:
"Scotch Mist" (Clements, Cowe, Hull, Ray Jackson, Ray Laidlaw) – 2:06
"No Time to Lose" (Hull) – 3:16

Charts

The album was the eighth bestselling album of 1972. In 1990, footballer Paul Gascoigne reached number 2 in the UK Singles Chart with the song "Fog on the Tyne", a collaborative cover with Lindisfarne that earned him a gold disc.

Personnel
Lindisfarne
Alan Hull - vocals, acoustic, electric and 12-string guitars, keyboards
Ray Jackson - vocals, mandolin, harmonica
Rod Clements - electric bass, acoustic, electric and 12-string guitars, violin
Simon Cowe - lead, acoustic and 12-string guitars, mandolin, vocals
Ray Laidlaw - drums
Technical
Ken Scott - engineer
Trevor Wiles and Franco Polsinelli  - sleeve

References

External links 

1971 albums
Lindisfarne (band) albums
Albums produced by Bob Johnston
Charisma Records albums
Elektra Records albums
Albums recorded at Trident Studios